John, Johnny or Jon Echols can refer to:
John Echols (1823–1896), American Civil War general
Johnny Echols (born 1947), American singer/songwriter and guitarist
Johnny Echols (baseball) (1917–1972), American major league player
Jon Echols (born 1979), American politician